Carl Sørensen may refer to:

 Carl Frederik Sørensen (1818–1879), Danish artist
 Carl Theodor Sørensen (1893–1979), Danish landscape architect